"A Ride on the Big Dipper" is a 1967 Australian television play. It screened as part of Wednesday Theatre and had a running time of one hour.

Plot
Hugh Kenton, is a 25 year old draughtsman with an engineering firm who is assessed by an efficiency expert as having an all-time high rating as potential management material. He is sent to North Queensland to take charge of the company's branch office. Kenton rapidly proves that he is in deed a brilliant manager - far more so than his associates ever believed.

Cast
Terry McDermott
Peter Aanensen
Alan Bickford
Fay Kelton
Lloyd Cunnington

Production
It was written by Newcastle journalist Ron Harrison. He later adapted it for radio. The radio version won an Awgie Award. It was shot in Melbourne at the ABC's studios in Ripponlea.

Reception
The Age said it "offered some fine parts and the actors did not disappoint."

The Sydney Morning Herald said "it held a tense interest."

The Bulletin called it "what TV drama should be. [Terry] McDermott gave a well-paced, intelligent performance as an efficiency - Frankenstein who got  clobbered by his own  mother in the cold, bloodless mayhem of business. Nothing novel or exciting in the plot, but everything so in seeing it in Australian terms; a believable drama of the times, with believable dialogue. As it was Harrison’s second TV play, and his first one-hour drama, I can only echo the ABC’s Phillip Mann, who said, "It was the kind of work we receive all too rarely, and we hope he intends to stay with it." A sense of drama seems to be the rare old some thing he's got, and here's hoping he is a stayer, because he seems to have the field to himself."

References

External links
 ''A Ride on the Big Dipper' at Austlit

1967 television plays
1967 Australian television episodes
1960s Australian television plays
Wednesday Theatre (season 3) episodes